The Dublin Senior Football Championship (currently known for sponsorship reasons as the Go-Ahead Dublin Senior Football Championship) is an annual Gaelic Athletic Association competition between the top Dublin GAA clubs. The winners of the Dublin Championship qualify to represent their county in the Leinster Senior Club Football Championship, the winners of which progress to the All-Ireland Senior Club Football Championship. The 2022 Dublin County Champions are  Kilmacud Crokes who defeated Na Fianna in the final.

History
The first Dublin Football Championship took place in 1887, Erin's Hope were the first Dublin Champions. St Vincent's have won the most titles, having won on twenty eight occasions.

There were no champions in 1902 as there was no Dublin Football Championship that year. The 1902 final was played in 1903, with Bray Emmets going on to represent Dublin and win the 1902 Leinster and All-Ireland Senior Football Championship representing Dublin (six Bray Emmets Players in all), a final which was played in 1904.

The Dublin senior football championship had received a dramatic revamp for 2006. A backdoor system was introduced and the new system was on a two-year trial which ended in 2007. A whole new system was introduced for the 2008 competition, the teams were divided into groups which were based on seeding from the previous year.  The new system was to only involve the senior football championship. The backdoor system was restored for 2009 but was then removed in 2012. The new format included the introduction of a 'Senior B' championship. All the teams that lost in the first round were placed within in competition which was run in parallel to the 'A' Championship.

The Championship received another revamp in 2018 where the straight knock-out format was removed and replaced with a group format that contained 16 teams divided into 4 groups of four. The four teams who played in the semi-final the previous year were seeded and placed in separate groups while the other 12 teams were drawn into the remaining spots. Each team plays the 3 other teams in their group once and the teams that finish first and second within their groups qualify for the quarter-finals.

Wins listed by club

Finals listed by year

Notes
  UCD refused to play due to college examinations and St. Vincent's were declared champions.
  Sean McDermott's, insisting that they could only field a team for an afternoon throw-in rather than the scheduled eight o'clock in the evening start, conceded a walkover.
  Geraldines lodged an objection claiming Kickhams had played an unregistered player and a replay was ordered.
  score uncertain - all forfeit points included in score.

Senior 2
The second tier of the senior championship was first founded in 2016 (Senior B) and with St Oliver Plunkett's Eoghan Ruadh crowned champions. In 2017 the second tier competition was known as the Senior Football Championship Tournament and was won by Ballyboden St Enda's. In 2016 and 2017, the losers in the first round of the senior championship formed the years B championship.

In 2018, the senior football championship tournament changed name to the Senior 2 Championship. In 2018, the second tier was given a more permanent set-up. The second tier of the Dublin Championship became a proper second tier in 2018. The teams that were placed in Senior 2 can only leave the championship through promotion and relegation. Senior 2 champions gain promotion to Senior 1 and one side can also be relegated to the Dublin Intermediate football championship from 2019 onwards.

References

External links
 Official Dublin Website
 Dublin on Hoganstand
 Dublin Club GAA
 Reservoir Dubs
 Dublin Teams

 
 1
The Herald (Ireland)
Senior Gaelic football county championships